Belder is a surname.

 Bas Belder (born 1946), Dutch politician and Member of the European Parliament
 Dylan De Belder (born 1992), Belgian footballer
 Pieter-Jan Belder (born 1966), Dutch instrumentalist in historically informed performance, playing recorder, harpsichord and fortepiano
 Rikki Belder (born 1993), Australian Track Cyclist